Regan Evans Charles-Cook (born 14 February 1997) is a professional footballer who plays as a winger for Belgian First Division A club Eupen. Born in England, he represents the Grenada national team.

Club career

Charlton Athletic
Following a move from Arsenal in 2013, Charles-Cook made his professional debut for Charlton Athletic on 11 August 2015, playing 90 minutes at right back in a 4–1 League Cup victory over Dagenham and Redbridge.

On 4 February 2017, Charles-Cook joined National League side Solihull Moors on loan for the remainder of the campaign. A week later, during his debut for Solihull, Charles-Cook scored twice against Sutton United in their 3–0 victory. On 17 April 2017, Charles-Cook sealed Solihull Moors' 3–1 away victory against Macclesfield Town, netting the third goal in the 93rd minute. Charles-Cook returned to Charlton following the conclusion of the campaign, in which he scored four times in thirteen games.

Following an impressive loan spell with Solihull, Charles-Cook returned to Charlton for the 2017–18 pre-season. He scored his first goal for Charlton in a 2–1 EFL Cup win against Exeter City on 8 August 2017.

On 1 September 2017, Charles-Cook joined Woking on loan until January 2018. A day later, Charles-Cook made his Woking debut during their 3–1 away victory against Macclesfield Town, replacing Jason Banton in the 60th minute. On 16 September 2017, Charles-Cook scored both goals in Woking's 2–0 home victory over local rivals, Sutton United. In January 2018, Charles-Cook returned to Charlton after sustaining a long-term ankle injury whilst at Woking. On 8 March 2018, Charles-Cook rejoined Woking on loan until 28 April 2018. A day later, he marked his return, assisting Charlie Carter for his tenth goal of the season in Woking's 3–1 home defeat against F.C. Halifax Town.

Gillingham
Charles-Cook reportedly signed a new one-year contract with Charlton at the end of the 2017-18 season, however shortly afterwards he signed for Gillingham on 30 May 2018.

Ross County
On 30 June 2020, Charles-Cook joined Scottish Premiership club Ross County. He struggled in his first season, with him citing homesickness and not being able to visit his family due to COVID-19 restrictions as factors, and was in and out of the team. His second season saw him become a regular in the side under new manager Malky MacKay, with his improved form seeing him linked with moves to Aberdeen and Hibernian. On 28 January 2022, he scored one of Ross County's goals in a 3–3 draw with Rangers, making him at the time the top goalscorer in the Scottish Premiership on 10 goals.

Eupen
On 8 June 2022, Charles-Cook joined Belgian First Division A side Eupen on a free transfer, signing a three-year deal.

International career
On 1 July 2021 Charles-Cook was called up to Grenada's squad for the 2021 CONCACAF Gold Cup. He started all three matches as Grenada exited at the group stage,  making his debut in the side's opening game of the tournament, a 4–0 defeat to Honduras.

Personal life
Charles-Cook was born in England and is of Jamaican and Grenadian descent. He is the brother of fellow professional footballers Anthony Cook and Reice Charles-Cook; they grew up with two other brothers in Beckenham. Charles-Cook's uncle, James Cook, is a former British super middleweight boxing champion.

Career statistics

Club

International

Honours

Individual

PFA Scotland Team of the Year: 2021–22 Scottish Premiership
 Scottish Premiership Top Scorer: 2021–22 (shared)
 Scottish Premiership Player of the Month: January 2022

References

External links

1997 births
Living people
Footballers from the London Borough of Lewisham
Grenadian footballers
Grenada international footballers
English footballers
English people of Jamaican descent
Sportspeople of Jamaican descent
English sportspeople of Grenadian descent
English sportspeople of Jamaican descent
Association football midfielders
Charlton Athletic F.C. players
Solihull Moors F.C. players
Woking F.C. players
Gillingham F.C. players
Ross County F.C. players
English Football League players
2021 CONCACAF Gold Cup players
National League (English football) players
Scottish Professional Football League players
Footballers from Beckenham
Arsenal F.C. players
Scottish league football top scorers
K.A.S. Eupen players
Expatriate footballers in Belgium
Belgian Pro League players
English expatriate footballers
English expatriate sportspeople in Belgium
Grenadian expatriate footballers